, also known as the , is a rubber-tired transit system operated by Hiroshima Rapid Transit in Hiroshima, Japan. Astram opened on August 20, 1994, for the 1994 Asian Games in Hiroshima. The line connects central Hiroshima and Hiroshima Big Arch, which was the main stadium of the Asian Games. On March 14, 2015, a new station, Shin-Hakushima, opened to make a new connection between the Astram Line and JR lines.

Stations

Rolling stock
 6000 series 6-car EMUs (23 sets)
 1000 series 6-car EMU (1 set)
 7000 series 6-car EMUs (11 sets on order)

, services on the line are operated using a fleet of 23 six-car 6000 series trainsets (sets 01 to 23) and one six-car 1000 series (set 24).

The entire fleet of 24 sets is scheduled to be replaced with a new fleet of six-car trains delivered in two batches. The first of 11 new 7000 series sets was delivered in 2019. They are scheduled to enter service in March 2020.

6000 series

The 6000 series trainsets (01 to 23) are formed as follows, with all cars motored.

Priority seating is provided in each car, and wheelchair spaces are provided in the end cars.

1000 series

The 1000 series trainset (24) is formed as follows, with four of the six cars motored.

Priority seating is provided in each car, and wheelchair spaces are provided in the end cars.

History
Plans to build a new transit system linking the city centre of Hiroshima with the suburban area to the northwest were first proposed in July 1977.

The third-sector Hiroshima Rapid Transit was founded in 1987, funded primarily by the city of Hiroshima.  Groundbreaking for the rapid transit line project began on February 28, 1989, and construction would continue over a five-year period. However, on March 14, 1991, 15 people were killed when a girder collapsed on a section of the line's elevated viaduct near the  station's construction site. The line opened for revenue service on August 20, 1994.

When the line originally opened in 1994, it had 21 stations, of which  provided the line's only transfer with a JR West line (the Kabe Line). On March 14, 2015,  opened as an infill station between Hakushima and Jōhoku in order to provide a transfer point with the Sanyo Main Line.

See also
 List of rapid transit systems

References

External links

  
 Map of Hiroshima rail transit network

 
Hiroshima Rapid Transit
Railway lines opened in 1994
750 V DC railway electrification
1994 establishments in Japan